Lauridsen is a surname. Notable people with the surname include:

John Lauridsen (born 1959), Danish former professional football (soccer) player
Karina Lauridsen (born 1976), Danish Paralympic swimmer
Lisbeth Stuer-Lauridsen (born 1968), female badminton player of Denmark
Mathias Lauridsen (born 1984), Danish model from Copenhagen, Denmark
Morten Lauridsen (born 1943), American composer
Thomas Stuer-Lauridsen (born 1971), Danish badminton player

Danish-language surnames